The Minster Church of St Andrew, also known as St Andrew's Church, Plymouth is an Anglican church in Plymouth. It is the original parish church of Sutton, one of the three towns which were later combined to form the city of Plymouth. The church is the largest parish church in the historic county of Devon and was built in the mid to late 15th century. The church was heavily damaged during the Plymouth Blitz but was rebuilt after the war. It was designated as a Minster Church in 2009 and it continues to operate as the focus for religious civic events for the city and as a bustling evangelical church.

It is likely to be on the site of the original Saxon church and was once attached to the abbey of Plympton.

History
The church existed at least as early as the beginning of the 12th century, possibly established in the 8th century but by the 15th century it needed to be enlarged because of the growth of the town. A Purbeck marble effigy tomb now located in the north transept is the only remaining feature of the earlier church. The principal building of Plymouth blue-sky limestone and Dartmoor  granite  corner buttressing in the Perpendicular style,  took place between 1430 and 1490. with a plaque on the tower dating to 1460. It is known to have been restored three times, in 1824 by John Foulston, in 1875 by Sir George Gilbert Scott, and by Sir Frederick Etchells after extensive bomb damage in World War II. The Resurgam Door is a commemoration of this. There are two aisles on each side of the nave and one each side of the chancel. The arcades are of the type which is standard in Cornwall at the period.

The organ, the largest west of Bristol, was built by Rushworth and Dreaper to a design by George Harry Moreton, William Lloyd Webber and O. H. Peasgood. Dr Harry Moreton (1864–1961) was the organist of St Andrew's from 1885 to 1958.

Blitz
In March 1941, St Andrew's Parish Church was bombed and badly damaged. Amid the smoking ruins a headmistress nailed over the door a wooden sign saying simply Resurgam (Latin for I shall rise again), indicating the wartime spirit, a gesture repeated at other devastated European churches. That entrance to St Andrew's is still referred to as the "Resurgam" door and a carved granite plaque is now permanently fixed there.

The Church was re-roofed and restored by Etchells and re-consecrated on 30 November 1957, St Andrew's Day. The restoration includes a new chancel as the old one had been made into a ruin.

Present day
The church belongs to the conservative evangelical tradition of Anglicanism, and has expressed support for GAFCON.

Plate
There is a notable collection of 17th-century plate, and one chalice and cover of 1590.

Clergy
 John Cavell, Vicar from 1962 to 1972, later Bishop of Southampton
 Ealphege, vicar in the reign of King William II (d. 1100)
 John Hatchard, vicar from 1824 to his death in 1869
 Joseph Hunkin began his career in 1914 with a curacy at St Andrew's; his last church appointment was as Bishop of Truro.
 Nick McKinnel, rector from 1994 to 2012 later bishop of Plymouth 
 Clifford Martin, vicar from 1939 to 1944, later fourth Bishop of Liverpool.
 Rod Thomas, curate from 1993 to 1999, later Bishop of Maidstone and provincial episcopal visitor for conservative evangelicals in the Church of England

Notable people
Katherine of Aragon, in thanksgiving for a safe voyage from Spain
Francis Drake
John Hawkins
King Charles II according to tradition performed touching for the king's evil here
Admiral Robert Blake was interred here and afterwards removed to Westminster Abbey (his heart is still thought to be buried under the church)
William Bligh, deposed in the Mutiny on the Bounty, was baptised here in 1754

References

Bibliography

Further reading
Fermer, Michael T. and Parkinson, John F., "A Short History and Pictorial Guide to the Church of St Andrew, Plymouth", The Church of St Andrew, Plymouth, May 1975.

External links

Minster Church of St Andrew: a brief history
St. Andrew's Church, Plymouth (official site)

Churches in Plymouth, Devon
Church of England church buildings in Devon
15th-century church buildings in England
British churches bombed by the Luftwaffe
Conservative evangelical Anglican churches in England